Forthill is a cricket ground in Broughty Ferry, Dundee, Scotland.  It has been used for cricket since, at the latest, 1884, when Forfarshire played Aberdeenshire there.  Scotland first used the ground in 1913 when they played Northamptonshire.  

The ground staged six first-class matches between 1924 and 1999. The first was in 1924 when Scotland played Ireland.  The touring Indians played Scotland in a first-class match there in 1932.  Almost twenty years elapsed before first-class cricket returned to Forthill, with Scotland playing Worcestershire in 1951.  The ground later played host to the touring New Zealanders in 1978 and Ireland in 1992, before hosting its final first-class match when Scotland played the South Africa Academy.  During the twentieth century the ground also hosted several other touring teams in non-first-class matches.

Forthill is still the home ground of Forfarshire Cricket Club.

References

External links
Forthill, Dundee at ESPNcricinfo
Forthill, Dundee at CricketArchive

 

Cricket grounds in Scotland
Sports venues in Dundee
Broughty Ferry